is a Japanese former professional basketball player. She won a silver medal with the Japan women's national basketball team at the 1994 Asian Games. Hagiwara also competed at the 1996 Summer Olympics, where Japan's team came in seventh place.

References 

1970 births
Living people
Asian Games medalists in basketball
Asian Games silver medalists for Japan
Basketball players at the 1994 Asian Games
Basketball players at the 1996 Summer Olympics
Japanese expatriate basketball people in the United States
Japanese women's basketball players
Medalists at the 1994 Asian Games
Olympic basketball players of Japan
People from Fukushima, Fukushima
Sportspeople from Fukushima Prefecture
Phoenix Mercury players
Sacramento Monarchs players
Shooting guards
21st-century Japanese women
20th-century Japanese women